Tetiaroa (French: Tetiaroa) is an atoll in the Windward group of the Society Islands of French Polynesia, an overseas territorial collectivity of France in the Pacific Ocean. Once the vacation spot for Tahitian royalty, the islets are under a 99-year lease contracted by Marlon Brando and are home to The Brando Resort.

Geography

Tetiaroa is administratively part of the commune of Arue, whose main part is in the northeastern part of Tahiti. The atoll has no reef opening, making access by boat nearly impossible.

The islets (or motus), in clockwise order starting from the southwest corner, include: Onetahi (with regulated airstrip and site of The Brando Resort), Honuea, Tiaruanu, Motu Tauvini (Tauini), Motu Ahurea (Auroa), Hiraanae, Horoatera (Oroatera), Motu 'Ā'ie, Tahuna Iti, Tahuna Rahi, Reiono, Motu One (emerging sandbank) and Rimatu'u (with an ornithology reserve).

Climate
Tetiꞌaroa has a tropical monsoon climate (Köppen climate classification Am).

History

Early years

The atoll of Tetiaroa was a special place for the Tahitian chiefs, as a place to entertain themselves with song, dance, fishing and feasting. It was also a special place for the ariori to practice their custom of ha'apori'a.  This custom included eating to gain weight, and staying out of the sun to whiten their skin.  Plump and pale was a sign of "well-being and prosperity" for the ariori and chiefs.  Tetiaroa was controlled by the chiefs of Pare-'Arue, and later, by members of the Pōmare Dynasty.

The United States Exploring Expedition visited the island on 10 September 1839.

Williams and Brando
In 1904, the royal family sold Tetiaroa to Johnston Walter Williams, a Canadian national and the only dentist in Tahiti. Williams later became Consul of the United Kingdom from 1916 to 1935. Williams managed Tetiaroa as a residence and a copra plantation.

In 1960, Marlon Brando "discovered" Tetiaroa while scouting filming locations for Mutiny on the Bounty, which was shot on Tahiti and neighboring Moorea. After filming was completed, Brando hired a local fisherman to ferry him to Tetiaroa. It was "more gorgeous than anything I had anticipated," he marveled in his 1994 autobiography Songs My Mother Taught Me. Brando eventually purchased Tetiaroa's islets (motus) from one of Williams's direct descendants, Mrs. (Madame) Duran. Williams and his wife are buried on Motu Rimatuu. Brando decided on the purchase in 1966, having to endure political interference and local resistance to secure the atoll, reef and lagoon, all of which is now the property of French Polynesia. Many important archaeological sites have been located, identified, and studied on Tetiaroa. Thus, the historical significance of Tetiaroa to the people (and the government) of French Polynesia continues to make future development questionable at best.

Wanting to live on the atoll, Brando built a small village on Motu Onetahi in 1970. It consisted of an airstrip to arrive without breaching the reef, 12 simple bungalows, a kitchen hut, dining hall and bar, all built from local materials: coconut wood, thatch roofs and even large sea shells for sinks. The village became a place for friends, family and researchers studying the atoll's ecology and archaeology. Over the years, Brando spent as much time on the atoll as he could, and valued it as a getaway from his hectic life in Hollywood. Although, ultimately, he didn’t spend as much time there as he’d wished to, it is said that he always cherished his moments on Tetiaroa. During his stays on the island, he was often visited by his children, grandchildren and great-grandchildren. Upon his death, Brando's son Teihotu lived on the island for some time. Eventually the village became a modest hotel managed by his Tahitian wife, Tarita Teriipaia, who had played his on-screen love in Mutiny on the Bounty. The hotel operated for more than 25 years, even after Brando had to leave French Polynesia to return to Los Angeles. Many hotel guests, arriving with higher expectations, lamented the lack of amenities normally found at an island “resort”.

In 1980, the maxi yacht SY  ran aground on the Onetahi reef, which caused it to be shipwrecked and written off by insurers. Purportedly, Brando and the owner of the yacht engaged in a brief bidding-war over rights to the vessel’s polished mahogany hull (as reported by the owner in the New Zealand yachting magazine Sail, in 1981), which Brando (allegedly) wanted to use as a bar at a new resort he planned to build on the island. The yacht was salvaged, and sent to New Zealand for repair. In 2002, two years before the actor's death, Brando signed a new will and trust agreement that left no instructions for Tetiaroa. Following his death in 2004, the Tetiaroa Village Hotel was closed and the staff evicted from the atoll. The atoll was closed to tourism. In August 2004, French Polynesian vice-president Hiro Tefaarerea advocated for the atoll to be declared a nature reserve to prevent development. Eventually, executors of the estate granted development rights to Pacific Beachcomber SC, a Tahitian company that owns hotels throughout French Polynesia. The Brando Resort was opened in July 2014.

Flora and Fauna
The island provides habitat for the following seabird species: Brown booby, red-footed booby, great crested tern, white tern, great frigatebird, lesser frigatebird, brown noddy, black noddy, sooty tern, and the grey-backed or spectacled tern. Shore and terrestrial birds include the Pacific reef egret, Pacific golden plover, wandering tattler, Pacific long-tailed cuckoo, and the bristle-thighed curlew.

Teti’aroa hosts five of the seven marine species of turtle, namely the Hawksbill turtle, green turtle, leatherback turtle, olive Ridley turtle, and loggerhead turtle.

Teti’aroa hosts numerous marine mammals, including the humpback whale, short-finned pilot whale, rough-toothed dolphin, spinner dolphin, Risso's dolphin, melon-headed whale, Blainville's beaked whale, Cuvier's beaked whale, and even some migrating pods of orca.

Numerous bony fishes, sharks, and rays are also present.

Plants include the fish-poison tree, Pacific ironwood, Alexandrian laurel, coconut palm, island walnut, dye fig, beach gardenia, beach heliotrope, lantern tree, breadfruit, lime tree, sea lettuce, and vanilla orchids, amongst others.

Conservation and Restoration

The presence of two invasive rat species significantly impacted the native vegetation, nesting seabird populations, sea turtle hatchlings, and land crabs. The Teti’aroa Society, Island Conservation, and The Brando Resort (among other partners) initiated an invasive rat-eradication project in the summer of 2022. After repeated pandemic-related disruptions, the operation took place over June and July 2022, covering 520 hectares of land and requiring more than 60 members of staff, plus volunteers. The hope is that this project will restore the terrestrial ecosystems, protect endangered native birds and turtles, and enhance the resilience of surrounding coral reefs, making them more resistant to climate change. Additional benefits may be ensuring food security for the local population, as well as eliminating reservoirs and vectors for human disease. In time, the atoll could become a translocation habitat for the Polynesian ground dove and the Tuamotu sandpiper. The next phase of the restoration program will be extensive research and monitoring, to record the subsequent benefits to the terrestrial and marine ecosystems.

References

External links 

 Tetiaroa Island at NASA Earth Observatory

Atolls of the Society Islands
Marlon Brando
Island restoration